"Stranger on the Shore" is a piece for clarinet written by Acker Bilk for his young daughter and originally named "Jenny" after her. The tune was written on a single scrap of paper by Bilk and handed over to Leon Young (1916-1991) who crafted the string arrangement, including the characteristic harmonic shifts at the very end.

The recording was subsequently used as the theme tune of a BBC TV drama serial for young people, Stranger on the Shore.  It was first released in 1961 in the UK, and then in the US, and reached number 1 in the US and number 2 in the UK.

In May 1969, the crew of Apollo 10 took "Stranger on the Shore" on their mission to the moon. Gene Cernan, a member of the crew, included the tune on a cassette tape used in the command module of the Apollo spacecraft.

Chart and sales performance
The track, performed by Bilk (as "Mr. Acker Bilk") with backing by the Leon Young String Chorale, was recorded at the Lansdowne Studios and produced by Denis Preston.  It was released as a single on EMI's Columbia label, catalogue number DB 4750, in October 1961; the label text states "Theme from the BBC T.V. Series".  The UK B-side was "Take My Lips" whereas the US flipside was "Cielito Lindo". The single became a phenomenal success, topping the NME singles chart and spending nearly a year on the Record Retailer Top 50. It was the UK's biggest-selling single of 1962, the biggest-selling instrumental single of all time, and appears fifty-eighth in the official UK list of best-selling singles issued in 2002. It had sold 1.16 million copies as of November 2012.

One of songwriter and music publisher Robert Mellin's major songwriting successes came in 1962, when he wrote lyrics for this song, allowing it to be covered by vocal acts including Andy Williams and the Drifters.

On 26 May 1962, "Stranger on the Shore" became the first British recording to reach number one on the U.S. Billboard Hot 100 where it was issued by Atlantic Records on the Atco label, but it was quickly followed, on 22 December, by British band The Tornados' "Telstar", another instrumental. In the pre-rock era, Vera Lynn's "Auf Wiederseh'n Sweetheart" had reached #1 in 1952, on the shorter "Best Sellers In Stores" survey. After "Telstar", the next  British performers to top the U.S. charts were the Beatles, with their first Capitol Records single "I Want to Hold Your Hand".  "Stranger on the Shore" was [[Billboard Year-End Hot 100 singles of 1962|Billboard'''s #1 single of 1962]], and it spent seven weeks atop the "Easy Listening" chart, which later became known as the Adult Contemporary chart.  The tune became the second of three "one-hit wonders" named "pop single of the year" by Billboard (the others being 1958's "Volare (Nel Blu Dipinto Di Blu)" by Domenico Modugno and 2006's "Bad Day" by Daniel Powter).

The song is certified gold by the Recording Industry Association of America.

All-time charts

Cover versions
The composition has been covered by many other artists, most prominently a vocal 1962 version by Andy Williams, which reached #9 on the adult contemporary chart, #30 in the UK, and #38 on the Billboard Hot 100, and a group vocal version by the Drifters, which reached #19 on the adult contemporary chart and #73 on the Billboard Hot 100.  Herb Alpert did his instrumental cover on his 1987 album Keep Your Eye on Me.  Kenny G covered it in 1999 on his album, Classics in the Key of G. A version in French, Savoir Aimer, was sung by Nana Mouskouri.

Charts

Album
Released in 1961, the original Stranger on the Shore album also featured the string arrangements of Leon Young and the performances of his Chorale string players. It primarily consists of melodies from classical, traditional and show music sources, but there is one more original: Is This the Blues'', also assembled by Young from a Bilk melody.

References

1961 singles
1962 singles
Andy Williams songs
The Drifters songs
Ruby & the Romantics songs
Billboard Hot 100 number-one singles
Cashbox number-one singles
Songs written for films
Children's television theme songs
1961 songs
Atco Records singles
Columbia Graphophone Company singles
Songs written by Robert Mellin
1960s instrumentals